Damjan Vuklišević (born 28 June 1995) is a Slovenian football defender who plays for Slovenian PrvaLiga side Celje.

Honours
Maribor
Slovenian PrvaLiga: 2013–14, 2014–15
Slovenian Supercup: 2013, 2014

Notes

References

External links
 NZS profile 
 

1995 births
Living people
Slovenian footballers
Association football defenders
Slovenia youth international footballers
Slovenian expatriate footballers
NK Maribor players
NK Krško players
NK Rudar Velenje players
FC Slovan Liberec players
NK Domžale players
NK Celje players
Slovenian Second League players
Slovenian PrvaLiga players
Czech First League players
Slovenian expatriate sportspeople in the Czech Republic
Expatriate footballers in the Czech Republic